Hacrochlamys lineolatus is a species of small air-breathing land snails, terrestrial pulmonate gastropod mollusks in the family Euconulidae, the hive snails.

This species is endemic to Japan. Its survival is endangered.

References

 A Japanese site has a listing for the species with the authority

Molluscs of Japan
Hacrochlamys
Taxa named by Henry Augustus Pilsbry
Taxonomy articles created by Polbot